Peter Dedon is an American engineer currently the Underwood-Prescott Professor of Biological Engineering at Massachusetts Institute of Technology.

References

Year of birth missing (living people)
Living people
MIT School of Engineering faculty
21st-century American engineers
St. Olaf College alumni
University of Rochester alumni
Place of birth missing (living people)